Guilherme Venâncio Matos (born 14 February 1994 in Calvão) is a Portuguese footballer who plays for JuveForce as a midfielder.

Football career
Matos played in five youth leagues: Covão do Lobo (2003—2005), Taboeira (2005—2006), Benfica (2006—2011), União Leiria (2011—2012), and Beira-Mar (2012—2013). While in youth football, he played on the national Portugal U16 team in 2009—2010 and on the national Portugal U18 team in 2011.

Matos signed with Beira-Mar professionally 2013-2015 and made his professional debut in January 2014 in a 2013–14 Taça da Liga match against Braga, when he started and played the full game. Shortly after, he was loaned to Oliveira do Bairro for 2014 and to Gafanha for 2014—2015. He subsequently signed with Gafanha for the 2015—2016 season before moving on to Vista Alegre (2016—2018). He returned to Beira-Mar for the 2018—2019 season before being traded to and signing with JuveForce. In 2021, he was loaned briefly to C.D. Luso, but returned to JuveForce by the start of the 2021—2022 season.

References

External links

Stats and profile at LPFP 

1994 births
Living people
Portuguese footballers
Association football midfielders
Liga Portugal 2 players
S.C. Beira-Mar players
Portugal youth international footballers
People from Vagos
Sportspeople from Aveiro District